Gabriela Mantellato Dias (born 28 October 1991 in Sao Paulo) is a water polo player of Brazil. She competed at the 2011 World Aquatics Championships, 2015 Pan American Games, and won a bronze medal at the 2011 Pan American Games.

She was part of the Brazilian team at the 2015 World Aquatics Championships. She won bronze medals at the 2011 and 2015 Pan American Games. She participated at the 2016 Summer Olympics.


See also
 Brazil at the 2015 World Aquatics Championships

References

External links
 Profile at CBDA

External links
Water Polo Announces The Signing Of Three For 2016-17
Gabi Mantellato - Women's Water Polo
Gabriela Mantellato Photostream

Brazilian female water polo players
Living people
Place of birth missing (living people)
1991 births
Water polo players from São Paulo
Olympic water polo players of Brazil
Water polo players at the 2016 Summer Olympics
Water polo players at the 2011 Pan American Games
Water polo players at the 2015 Pan American Games
Pan American Games water polo players of Brazil
Pan American Games medalists in water polo
Pan American Games bronze medalists for Brazil
Water polo players at the 2019 Pan American Games
Medalists at the 2011 Pan American Games
Medalists at the 2015 Pan American Games
Medalists at the 2019 Pan American Games
21st-century Brazilian women